In mathematical optimization, total dual integrality is a sufficient condition for the integrality of a polyhedron. Thus, the optimization of a linear objective over the integral points of such a polyhedron can be done using techniques from linear programming.

there is an integer optimal dual solution.

Thus, if a linear program as above is solved by the simplex algorithm, the optimal solution returned will be integer. Further, Giles and Pulleyblank showed that if  is a polytope whose vertices are all integer valued, then  is the solution set of some TDI system , where  is integer valued.

Note that TDI is a weaker sufficient condition for integrality than total unimodularity.

References

Linear programming